The OFC Women's Olympic Qualifying Tournament is an association football tournament held once in four years to decide the only qualification spot of the Oceania Football Confederation (OFC) and representatives at the Olympic Games.

The tournament was first held in 2004. In 1996 no OFC team took part at the Olympics, in 2000 Australia were given the spot as hosts.

Format
In 2004 three teams played a round robin. After Australia had left the Oceanic Confederation to Asia, all teams but New Zealand play a tournament. The winner then plays a two-legged play-off for the Olympics spot against New Zealand, Oceania's highest ranked team in the FIFA Women's World Rankings.

Results

1 The second leg was scratched as Papua New Guinea was unable to travel to New Zealand for the match due to visa issues.

2 The OFC place at the 2020 Olympics was decided by the 2018 OFC Women's Nations Cup.

References

External links
OFC Official Website

 
Oceania Football Confederation competitions for women's national teams
Football qualification for the Summer Olympics